Kronos Total Citroën World Rally Team was a semi-private rally team that competed in the World Rally Championship in the  season. The team was made up of some existing drivers of the 2005 Citroën official team, which took a sabbatical though supported the Belgian Kronos Racing team to enter in the manufacturer's name.

Competition history 
The Citroën factory team withdrew from the World Rally Championship for a year and selected Kronos to represent the brand in the 2006 season. The team took care of three Citroën Xsara WRCs, one of which was reserved for reigning world champion Sébastien Loeb. The other two were carried by Xavier Pons and Daniel Sordo. Colin McRae also replaced the injured Loeb in Turkey. Loeb and Citroën also led two championships after the Cyprus rally, but Loeb's withdrawal following the mountain bike accident and the inability of other Citroën drivers to oppose Ford drivers Marcus Grönholm and Mikko Hirvonen, allowed Ford's to steal the manufacturers' championship from them.

WRC Results

References

External links
Team profile at Juwra.com

World Rally Championship teams